Paul Gury was the stage name of Loïc (Louis-Marie) Le Gouriadec (May 11, 1888 - November 13, 1974), a French-Canadian film and theatre actor, director and writer. He was most noted as the director of three significant films in the early Cinema of Quebec.

Career
Born in Vannes, Morbihan, France, he emigrated to Montreal, Quebec in 1907, and studied dramatic arts at the Conservatoire Lassalle. In 1918, he became director of Montreal's Théâtre National. He wrote or cowrote a number of stage plays during this era, including Le Mortel baiser, L'Homme au foulard blanc, Les Dopés, Les Esclaves blanches and a theatrical adaptation of Louis Hémon's novel Maria Chapdelaine. He remained with the theatre until 1936, when he was succeeded as director by Rose Ouellette.

In the 1930s, he began working in film, with acting and screenwriting credits in several French films, and in broadcasting as a writer of radio dramas for CKVL, CKAC and Radio-Canada. His noted radio dramas included La Fiancée du commando and Le procès du fils de l’homme.

He was hired by producer Paul L'Anglais to direct A Man and His Sin, the 1949 film adaptation of Claude-Henri Grignon's novel Un homme et son péché. In the same year he also directed The Village Priest (Le Curé de village), and in 1950 he released Séraphin, a sequel to A Man and His Sin.

He had occasional acting roles thereafter, including in stage productions of Jean Anouilh's The Lark and Maurice Gagnon's Edwige, and continued to write for radio into the 1960s, including the dramatic serials Vies de femmes and L'Hirondelle du faubourg.

Throughout his career, he was credited as Paul Gury when acting or directing, but used his real name in writing credits.

Personal life
He was married to actress Yvette Brind'Amour, with whom he participated in the creation of her theatre company Théâtre du Rideau Vert in 1949.

Filmography

References

External links

1888 births
1974 deaths
20th-century Canadian male actors
20th-century Canadian male writers
20th-century Canadian screenwriters
20th-century Canadian dramatists and playwrights
20th-century French male actors
20th-century French male writers
20th-century French screenwriters
20th-century French dramatists and playwrights
Canadian male stage actors
Canadian male film actors
Canadian male television actors
Canadian theatre directors
Canadian dramatists and playwrights in French
Canadian screenwriters in French
French male stage actors
French male film actors
French male television actors
French male dramatists and playwrights
French theatre directors
French film directors
French emigrants to Canada
Film directors from Montreal
Writers from Montreal
Writers from Vannes